Jeff Dwyer is a Canadian politician, who was elected to the Newfoundland and Labrador House of Assembly in the 2019 provincial election. He represents the electoral district of Placentia West-Bellevue as a member of the Newfoundland and Labrador Progressive Conservative Party. Dwyer was re-elected in the 2021 provincial election.

Dwyer served as Bowater House president at Memorial University of Newfoundland in 2000.

Election results

References

Living people
Progressive Conservative Party of Newfoundland and Labrador MHAs
21st-century Canadian politicians
Year of birth missing (living people)